Out of Order is an  American dramedy television miniseries created and written by Donna Powers and Wayne Powers (Deep Blue Sea, The Italian Job), who also directed the first and final episodes. The show lasted one season (six episodes) which aired on Showtime from June 1, 2003 to June 30, 2003.

Premise

An unsatisfying marriage leads a man to consider a relationship with someone else.

Cast
 Eric Stoltz as Mark Colm
 Felicity Huffman as Lorna Colm
 Kim Dickens as Danni
 Dyllan Christopher as Walter
 Justine Bateman as Annie
 William H. Macy as Steven
 Peter Bogdanovich as Zach
 Lane Smith as Frank
 Celia Weston as Carrie
 Adam Harrington as Brock

Episodes
 "Pilot (Part One)"
 "Pilot (Part Two)"
 "The Art of Loss"
 "Losing My Religion"
 "Follow the Rat"
 "Put Me In Order"

Production
Asked about the X-rated underwater sequence with Eric Stoltz, Kim Dickens said, "The irony is that once Eric and I were down there without masks on, looking at each other underwater, we can't really see much. We just took the leap of faith, and we did it, and we felt good about it because it felt kind of real."

Reception
The New York Times called it one of the "Ten Best Shows on Television" in 2003. The Associated Press said, "It warrants comparison with the best of television, HBO's Six Feet Under and The Sopranos."

Awards and nominations
The series was nominated for a Golden Satellite Award for Best Miniseries and also nominated for an Artios, Best Casting for TV Miniseries. Justine Bateman won a Golden Satellite Award for Best Performance by an Actress in a Supporting Role in a Miniseries or a Motion Picture Made for Television. Felicity Huffman was nominated for Best Performance by an Actress in a Miniseries, or a Motion Picture Made for Television.

DVD release
The pilot episode is available on DVD. The series was also edited together and released on DVD as a standalone feature film by Showtime Entertainment.

References

External links
 

2003 American television series debuts
2003 American television series endings
2000s American comedy-drama television series
Showtime (TV network) original programming
Television series by CBS Studios
English-language television shows